The Best of Joe Cocker was a compilation album of hits by Joe Cocker released in 1983 by EMI in Australia. The album spent three weeks at the top of the Australian album charts in 1983.

Track listing
"With a Little Help from My Friends"
"Delta Lady"
"Feeling Alright"
"The Letter"
"She Came in Through the Bathroom Window"
"High Time We Went"
"Darling Be Home Soon"
"Sweet Little Woman"
"I Can Stand a Little Rain"
"Up Where We Belong"
"Hitchcock Railway"
"You Are So Beautiful"
"Put Out the Light"
"Something"
"Marjorine"
"Guilty"
"Dear Landlord"
"Just Like a Woman"

Chart positions

1983 greatest hits albums
Joe Cocker compilation albums
EMI Records compilation albums